Schalk Willem Hendrik Erasmus (born 16 April 1998) is a South African rugby union player for  in the Currie Cup and the Rugby Challenge. His regular position is hooker.

He made his Currie Cup debut for Western Province in July 2019, coming on as a replacement hooker in their Round Six match of the 2019 season against .

Honours
 Currie Cup winner 2020–21
 Pro14 Rainbow Cup runner-up 2021

References

South African rugby union players
Living people
1998 births
People from Lephalale Local Municipality
Rugby union hookers
Western Province (rugby union) players
South Africa Under-20 international rugby union players
Rugby union players from Limpopo
Stormers players
Bulls (rugby union) players
Blue Bulls players
Kubota Spears Funabashi Tokyo Bay players